The Għar Għerduf catacombs at Ta' Kerċem, also known as Għar Gerduf, are the only surviving early Christian catacombs or paleochristian hypogea in Gozo, Malta. Għar Għerduf is a unique Roman burial site in Gozo, which has for centuries attracted the attention of scholars interested in Maltese archaeology. The site was visited by erudite visitors who often included a description of the place as they did for Ġgantija and the Xagħra Stone Circle.

History

The catacombs are dug into the local Globigerina Limestone, on the western slope of Lunzjata Valley. The probable first mention of the site belongs to the Maltese historian Giovanni Francesco Abela, who described the site as a cave which was one of the many , that is, crypts of ancient cemeteries. 

The complex has suffered extensive damage, due to widespread quarrying during the nineteenth century, with Vassallo dating the mutilation to the 1870s. 

The site, however, had been in a poor state of conservation for centuries: The Gozitan historian Giovanni Pietro Francesco Agius de Soldanis already said the catacombs included only one passageway, the only one of many that remained by the mid-eighteenth century. 

Originally, the complex had a long corridor which extended for around 14 metres in an east-west direction. A number of arcosolia are hewn into the walls. These vary in size, some having one trough-tomb, others having from three to five. Four of these tombs with headrests can still be identified.

During Late Antiquity, Ghar Għerduf may have served as a burial ground serving the Roman settlement at Rabat. Għar Gerduf is the only late Roman and Byzantine catacomb in Gozo described by Prof. Mario Buhagiar in his archaeological survey of 1986, for which the exact whereabouts are known, and that is still visible.

Conservation 
 

Għar Għerduf was the only Phoenician, Carthaginian and Roman site in Gozo featured in the List of Buildings, Sites and Remains for the purposes of Article 6 of The Protection of Antiquities Act of 1925. By then, however, the surviving remains were already in an abandoned and poor state. Għar Gerduf suffered substantial mutilation during the second half of the nineteenth century. Almost all the internal wall partitions aligning the arcosolia were chiselled down, while the floor was lowered by several metres to form two interlinking and split-level halls. Luckily, however, the ceiling preserves enough information to permit a reliable reconstruction of the hypogeum’s original set-up. This resulting peculiar configuration is, in turn, unique when compared to other sites in Malta and in other countries. 

In 2000, the site's protection was extended through Government Notice 856 of 2000 which designated Għar Għerduf and a 100 metre buffer zone as a Class A Site of Archaeological Importance, a scheduling which is comparable to that given to Mnajdra and Ħaġar Qim. 

By the mid-2010s, plans were submitted for construction within the remains' archaeological buffer zone, which would have made access to the site difficult. NGOs and activists called for the remains to be protected and saved. By 2017, several fissures and overgrown weeds were plainly visible in the catacomb structure. The site was eventually saved from development, with the building permit issued on the basis of wrong data being rescinded. In 2019, public authorities bought up €400,000 worth of land in the area through expropriation to aid the protection of the site. Authorities are working on cleaning and improving access to the site, with further excavations not being excluded.

See also 
 Abbatija Tad-Dejr

References

Bibliography

Primary

Secondary 
 
 

 
Gozo
Catacombs of Malta
Subterranea (geography)
Archaeological sites in Malta